In October 1994, anti-Urdu riots that involved a series of clashes took place in Jagajeevanram Nagar neighborhood in Bangalore, Karnataka, India. The riots were believed to be a reaction against telecast of Urdu news on India's national television channel, Doordarshan at prime-time. The riots resulted in over 25 deaths and around 150 people were injured.

See also
 1991 Anti-Tamil violence of Karnataka

References

Notes
 

1994 in India
1994 riots
1990s in Bangalore
Language conflict in India
Doordarshan
Riots and civil disorder in India
Urdu
Regionalism in India
Crime in Bangalore